The Men's Shot put at the  IPC Athletics Asia-Oceania Championship 2016 was held at the Dubai Police Club Stadium in Dubai from 7–12 March.

Results
Legend

AS: Asian Record

WR: World Record

PB: Personal Best

SB: Season Best

F35/36 Final 
Date- 07:March:2016

Time- 16:15

F55/56 Final

Date- 07:March:2016

Time- 16:15

References 

IPC Athletics Asia-Oceania Championship 2016